The Barkly Region, formerly Barkly Shire, is a local government area of the Northern Territory of Australia, administered by the Barkly Regional Council. The region's main town is Tennant Creek.

History
In October 2006 the Northern Territory Government announced the reform of local government areas. The intention of the reform was to improve and expand the delivery of services to towns and communities across the Northern Territory by establishing eleven new shires. The Barkly Shire was created on 1 July 2008, as were the remaining ten shires. On 1 January 2014, it was renamed Barkly Region.

The Barkly Region is administered by the Barkly Regional Council.

The most recent elections of Councillors were held on 26 August 2017. The current President (Mayor) of the Region is Steve Edgington.

In 2019, a proposal was made to build a  solar farm in the region, which would become the world’s largest solar energy project.

In 2021, the region had the lowest rate of vaccination against COVID-19 pandemic.

Wards
The Barkly Regional Council is divided into 4 wards, which is governed by a President and 12 councillors across four wards:
 Alyawarr Ward (South) (4)
 Patta Ward (West) (5)
 Kuwarrangu (until 2016 Yapakurlangu) (Northeast) (2)
 Alpururrulam Ward (Southeast) (1)

Localities and communities
Land within the Barkly Region was divided during 2007 into bounded areas for the purpose of creating an address for a property.  The bounded areas are called "localities", with those localities associated with Aboriginal communities being called "communities".

Localities

Anmatjere  (part) 
Costello    
Creswell    
Davenport  
Elliott   
Newcastle Waters
Nicholson 
Pamayu    
Ranken   
Sandover   (part)  
Tablelands       
Tanami East 
Tennant Creek    
Warumungu

Communities

Ali Curung   
Alpurrurulam    
Ampilatwatja    
Canteen Creek    
Tara    
Wutungurra

Outstations
Outstations, also known as homelands, are tiny remote settlements, often comprising an extended family. Outstations in Barkly include:
 Mulga Bore, also known as Akaya, Akaye, Atartinga and Athathenga, a family outstation (longitude: 134.209, latitude: -22.451), which includes Mulga Bore School

Footnotes

References

External links

 
Barkly Shire